Soehrensia huascha,  is a species of Soehrensia in the Cactaceae family, found in north western Argentina.
First published in Cactaceae Syst. Init. 29: 5 in 2013.

Was formerly thought to be a species of Echinopsis.

Description
The plants usually branch at the base and form low groups with heights of up to 1 meter. The cylindrical, fresh green, upright or creeping trunks with an erect shoot tip have 14 to 17 ribs and reach about 5 centimeters in diameter. The areoles, from which the yellowish to brownish, needle-like thorns arise, reach a diameter of up to 1 centimetre. The 1 to 3 central spines are slightly thicker than the radial spines and are between 2 and 7 centimeters long. The 9 to 11 radial spines are up to 1.5 inches long.

The funnel-shaped to bell-shaped flowers that appear near the apex are very variable. They open during the day and are up to 10 centimeters long and up to 7 centimeters in diameter. The olive green, 4.5 centimetre long flower cup is covered with 4 to 6 millimetre long, brownish to black hair.

The spherical to egg-shaped fruits are yellowish green or reddish and reach a diameter of up to 3 centimeters.

Subspecies
It has 2 accepted subspecies;
 Soehrensia huascha subsp. huascha
 Soehrensia huascha subsp. robusta

References

External links
 
 

Flora of Northwest Argentina
huascha